Rhynchospora berteroi, known by the common name of little beaksedge, is a member of the sedge family, Cyperaceae. It is a perennial herb, native to wetlands in the Caribbean islands and Belize, and also found in the southeastern United States.

References

External links

berteroi
Flora of Belize
Flora of Cuba
Flora of Haiti
Flora of the Dominican Republic
Flora of Jamaica
Flora of Puerto Rico
Flora of Alabama
Flora of Georgia (U.S. state)
Plants described in 1900
Plants described in 1788